Amchi Shala is a Marathi medium school, founded by Shri. J. K. Karmalkar in Tilak Nagar, Mumbai, Maharashtra in 1961.

History
In the 1960s, Tilak Nagar situated between Chembur and Ghatkopar was a residential colony constructed for industrial workers, working in and around Chembur. There were no schooling facilities for the workers and their children. The population mainly consisted of financially lower-middle-class Maharashtrian families.

Shri Janardan Krishna Karmalkar, a teacher with experience of founding schools like Chembur High School, shifted his attention to this needy area. The Housing Board gave him part of building no 26 in Tilak Nagar to start his endeavor. He founded a trust Gareeb Vidyarthi Sahayyak Mandal (GVS Mandal) in 1958. The aim of the trust is embedded in the name itself A trust to help poor and needy class of society. He started a school under the auspices of the trust on 19 June 1961, which was called as Amchi Shala.

Throughout the formation of the trust and the school, he was supported by his wife Smt. Indira Karmalkar also a teacher and later Principal of Amchi Shala.  In the beginning there were 310 students with 7 divisions and 11 teaching staff.

Other schools
 Adarsha Vidyalaya
 Chembur Karnatak High School
 General Education Academy
 Holy Family High School
 Lokmanya Tilak High School
 Our Lady of Perpetual Succour High School
 Saraswati Vidya Mandir.

See also
 List of schools in Mubai

References

External links
 Google.com

Educational institutions established in 1961
Schools in Chembur
Schools in Mumbai
Education in Mumbai
1961 establishments in Maharashtra